Sri Lanka is an island close to the southern end of India with a tropical environment. The invertebrate fauna is as large as it is common to other regions of the world. There are about two million species of arthropods found in the world, and still it is counting with many new species still being discovered. It is very complicated and difficult to summarize the exact number of species found within a certain region.

The following list provide the freshwater crabs of Sri Lanka.

Freshwater crabs
Phylum: Arthropoda   Subphylum: Crustacea
Class: Malacostraca  Order: Decapoda 

Sri Lanka's freshwater crab fauna is extremely important to the island, due to its endemism. All recorded 51 species, along with five genera, are totally endemic to Sri Lanka. 98% of those crabs are IUCN categorized as threatened, endangered or critically endangered animals due to habitat declining, capturing for food, illegal collecting and exotic species.

Family: Gecarcinucidae
 
 Ceylonthelphusa alpina 
 Ceylonthelphusa armata 
 Ceylonthelphusa callista 
 Ceylonthelphusa cavatrix 
 Ceylonthelphusa diva 
 Ceylonthelphusa durrelli
 Ceylonthelphusa kandambyi
 Ceylonthelphusa kotagama 
 Ceylonthelphusa nata 
 Ceylonthelphusa orthos 
 Ceylonthelphusa rugosa 
 Ceylonthelphusa savitriae 
 Ceylonthelphusa sentosa
 Ceylonthelphusa sanguinea
 Ceylonthelphusa soror 
 Ceylonthelphusa venusta 
 Clinothelphusa kakoota 
 Mahatha adonis 
 Mahatha helaya 
 Mahatha iora 
 Mahatha lacuna 
 Mahatha ornatipes 
 Mahatha regina 
 Oziotelphusa ceylonensis 
 Oziotelphusa dakuna 
 Oziotelphusa gallicola 
 Oziotelphusa hippocastanum 
 Oziotelphusa intuta
 Oziotelphusa kodagoda
 Oziotelphusa mineriyaensis 
 Oziotelphusa populosa
 Oziotelphusa ritigala 
 Oziotelphusa stricta 
 Pastilla dacuna 
 Perbrinckia fenestra 
 Perbrinckia cracens 
 Perbrinckia enodis 
 Perbrinckia fido 
 Perbrinckia gabadagei 
 Perbrinckia glabra 
 Perbrinckia integra 
 Perbrinckia morayensis 
 Perbrinckia punctata 
 Perbrinckia quadratus
 Perbrinckia rosae 
 Perbrinckia scansor - only tree climbing crab in Sri Lanka. 
 Perbrinckia scitula 
 Perbrinckia uva 
 Spiralothelphusa fernandoi 
 Spiralothelphusa parvula

References

Bibliography

External links
 Slendemics.net
 Bailamn.blogspot.com
 Gallicissa.blogspot.com
 Sundaytimes.lk

 
.
Crabs
Sri Lanka